¿Qué dicen los famosos? is an American Spanish-language version of the game show Celebrity Family Feud. The show premiered on Telemundo on October 2, 2022. The series is hosted by Rodrigo Vidal. Each episode features teams of celebrities playing as a family for charity.

Format 
Two teams of celebrities, each represented by four members, compete to determine the answers to survey questions. Each round begins with a "face-off" question to see which team will gain control of that particular question. The team with the highest number of points after five rounds of play wins the game. At the end of the main game, the winning team selects two celebrities to play the bonus round, known as "Fast Money".

Ratings 
 
}}

Episodes

References 

2022 American television series debuts
2020s American game shows
Spanish-language television shows
Family Feud
Telemundo original programming
Television series by Fremantle (company)
Celebrity competitions